Kelvin Tan (born 22 August 1964) is a Singaporean musician, writer and lecturer. He has released two novels, All Broken Up and Dancing (1992), and the Nethe(r);R (2001) and over 102 musical albums. He teaches part-time at LASALLE College of the Arts and is guitarist for The Oddfellows, for whom he wrote and sang the hit "She's So Innocent".

Tan is also a member of the bands Stigmata, Prana vs r-H and Path Integral. In 1997, he co-founded Aporia Society, a multi-disciplinary arts society.

Early life
Educated at Anglo-Chinese School. As a 14-year-old, he was introduced to the music of Charlie Parker, Bob Dylan and Joni Mitchell, and the literature of JD Salinger, Saul Bellow and Philip Roth. He failed his 'O' Levels in 1981. Tan later attended Jurong Junior College and graduated from the National University of Singapore with a Bachelor of Arts (Honours) in Literature in 1990.

Career
In 1982, Tan was awarded a merit certificate for "Swan Leda" in the Shell National Short-Story Competition. In 1986, his play Tramps Like Us was awarded third prize in the Shell Short Play Competition. He joined The Oddfellows as lead guitarist in 1991.

His novel All Broken Up and Dancing (1992) was originally a short story published in The Straits Times in 1985. In 1986, he contributed the song "Seen the End" to BigO magazine's Nothing on the Radio cassette. The song was a response to the Hotel New World disaster of the same year.

Bibliography

Novels

Plays 
 Tramps Like Us (1986)
 Goodbye Jennifer (1987–88)
 Flights Through Darkness (1994–95)
 Life is an Angel (1998)
 Vermeiden//a(Void) (1998)

Selected Discography

 The Bluest Silence (1998)
 Alone, descending Sisyphus (1999)
 Songs In Search Of An Other (2000)
 Disembowelling Brecht (2001)
 Being; In The Light Of Convergence (2001)
 Mortal Songs For Believers (2002)
 Understanding The Lion (2002)
 Remnants From The Cities Of Reasons (2002)
 Meta(axis): In Reverse (2002)
 Truths And Consequences (2003)
 Myths From The Wilderness (2003)
 Dreams Of The Enigma Revealed (2003)
 The Wilderness Quartets (2004)
 When Our Spirits Awaken (2005)
 Weltanschauung Septet (2006)
 She Who Communes With The Stars (2007)
 ...and her eyes said yes... (2010)
 From where i stand, it's all changing (2010)
 The Passion (2010)
 Below the Abyss (2011)
 Bound by Affection (2011)
 Lost Songs, Now Redeemed (2011)
 Ah Boy, Me and TNT! (2011)
 Together, Naturally (2011)
 Solitude, In Spite Of (2011)
 Tributaries (2011)
 Talkin' True, Lightnin' Blues (2011)
 The Heart (2011)
 The Taipei Shuttle and How To Use It (2011)
 Love Has To Be So Hard (2011)
 Re: Visions (2011)
 Evocations for Solace (2011)
 Homages (2011)
 The Souls of Old Harbours (2011)
 Dignity (2011)
 If you never know where you were, then you were never lost. (2012)
 Eurology for Paul Motian (2012)
 Odes for Asphodel's Smiles (2012)
 Perceptualities (2012)
 Slightly towards the Dawn (2012)
 Surfacing In (2012)
 Searching for the meaning of Incandenscence (2012)
 More lightning blues for you (2012)
 Modern Madrigals for Hope (2012)
 My Brother, My Soul (2012)
 Alive, in time (2012)
 Magpie till I die! (2012)
 Old melodies, made new, for my beatrice (2012)
 The Yearning (2012)
 Unhinged for Falling Stars (2012)
 The light that falls (2012)
 Transmigration of Citizen N (2013)
 Fighting the Fire (2013)
 Jacqtourismo! (2013)
 Morning Set! (2013)
 Flying low; Covered in Hope (2013)
 Lucidity (2013)
 Turning inwards, Raging fire (2013)
 Random Ubiquities (2013)
 Unravelling the Hunger (2013)
 We, the Sound, and the Zeitgeist (2013)

References

1964 births
Living people
Singaporean people of Chinese descent
Anglo-Chinese School alumni
National University of Singapore alumni
Singaporean musicians
Singaporean singer-songwriters
21st-century Singaporean male singers
Singaporean writers
Singaporean novelists
Singaporean dramatists and playwrights